The Bangladesh Election Commission , abbreviated and publicly referred to as EC, is an independent constitutional body that operates the legal functions of election laws in Bangladesh.

Article 118 of the Bangladeshi Constitution allows the commission to be formed consisting of a chief election commissioner alongside a number of assisting election commissioners under permission granted by the president of Bangladesh.

Structure
The appointment of the Chief Election Commissioner of Bangladesh and other election commissioners (if any) is made by the president. When the election commission consists of more than one person, the chief election commissioner is to act as its chairman. Under the constitution, the term of office of any election commissioner is five years from the date on which he enters upon office. A person who has held office as chief election commissioner is not eligible for appointment in the service of the Republic. Any other Election Commissioner is, on ceasing to hold such office, eligible for appointment as Chief Election Commissioner, but is not eligible for appointment in the service of the Republic.

|Chief Election Commissioner
|Kazi Habibul Awal
|Chairman
|27 February 2022
|-
|Election Commissioner
|Md. Alamgir
|Election Administration
|27 February 2022
|-
|Election Commissioner
|Anisur Rahman
|Investigation and Adjudication
|27 February 2022
|-
|Election Commissioner
|Rashida Sultana Emily
|Public Participation
|27 February 2022
|-
|Election Commissioner
|Brigadier General (retd) Ahsan Habib Khan
|General Administration
|27 February 2022
|-
|Secretary
|Md. Humayun Kabir Khandker
|Election Commission's Secretariat
|26 January 2021

History
The Election Commission was formed on 23 March 1956 as the Election Commission of Pakistan, and after Bangladesh Liberation War, it has been restructured, reformed and renamed in 1972 to its present from.

Functions and powers
Powers of Election Commission (Article 118(4) and 126 of the constitution, read with Article 4 of the Representation of the People Order, 1972): The Election Commission is an independent constitutional body in the exercise of its functions and subject only to the Constitution and any other law. The Commission may authorize its chairman or any of its members or any of its officers to exercise and perform all or any of its powers and functions under the law. Article 126 of the constitution and Articles 4 and 5 of the Representation of the People Order, 1972 provide that it shall be the duty of all executive authorities to assist the election commission in the discharge of its functions. The commission has the power to require any person or authority to perform such functions or render such assistance for the purpose of election as it may direct.

United States, the European Union and the United Kingdom have announced that they will send election observers to Bangladesh.

Guardian of free and fair elections
It oversees government elections parliamentary elections and local elections) as well as referendums throughout Bangladesh. Established by the 1972 Constitution, the Election Commission (EC) has extensive powers to manage, oversee, and regulate the electoral process.,.,..,

Registration of political parties
A law regarding to this registration process was enacted in 2008 and number of parties got registered with the commission. It helps to avoid confusion and headache of the administrative machinery as well as confusion of the electorate. It ensures that political parties can practice democracy only by their registration.
The commission has the power to investigate the finances and donor lists of all political parties.

Prohibition on publication
The commission can issue an order for the prohibition of publication and disseminating of results of opinion polls or exit polls to prevent influencing the voting trends in the electorate.

Quasi judicial powers
The commission has quasi-legal powers as a law enforcement agency to investigate and indict those who compromise election laws through bribery, corruption, vote buying, or blackmail.

Secretariat

Central

Bangladesh Election Commission has its own secretariat as per Election Commission Secretariat Act 2009, which is headed by a secretary. The secretariat is located at Agargaon in Dhaka city and has Electoral Training Institutes and field offices at the Regional, District and Upazila/Thana levels. Functions of the Election Commission Secretariat is to execute the decisions and orders of the commission.

The present secretary of the election commission is Md. Alamgir.

Regional
There are Election Offices located at 7 Divisional Headquarters and 3 other districts. Functions of the divisional offices are to maintain liaison between the Election Commission Secretariat and the subordinate field level offices, and to co-ordinate the works relating to conduct of all types of elections, new registrations and periodic updates to the voters list and preparation of electoral rolls including day-to-day amendment and correction in the list of electoral rolls and other matters as and when entrusted by the Election Commission.

District office

There are 83 District Election Offices in the 64 District Headquarters headed by District Election Officers. They carry out all work relating to registration of voters, printing of voters list, management of national and local level elections, training of polling personnel and all logistical arrangements for elections. As an officer of the Election Commission, the District Election Officer renders all possible assistance to the Returning Officers and polling personnels with forms, packets, manuals, instructions and supply of ballot boxes, electoral rolls, ballot papers and maintains all accounts for expenses incurred for different elections.

Sub-district office 

At the lowest tier of the field organization, there are Upazila/Thana Election Officers at every Upazila/Thanas. The main function of the Upazila/Thana Election Officers are to assist divisional/district offices in the discharge of functions relating to elections.

Controversy

Corruption allegations

On December 19, 2020, 42 eminent citizens of Bangladesh urged the President to constitute a supreme judicial council to probe the corruption allegations against the Chief Election Commissioner KM Nurul Huda and his deputies. The allegations included misappropriation of around 20 million Bangladeshi taka for imaginary programs, embezzlement of 40.8 million BDT during the recruitment process of election commission staff, purchasing the electronic voting machine at a higher price than the market rate, usage of extra cars by three election commissioners flouting rules.

See also
 Chief Election Commissioner of Bangladesh
 Election Commissioner of Bangladesh
 Elections in Bangladesh

References

Bangladesh
Elections in Bangladesh
Election Commission of Bangladesh